Andy Canzanello (born December 1, 1981) is an American professional ice hockey defenseman currently an unrestricted free agent who most recently played for HC Valpellice in the Serie A.

Undrafted after a four-year collegiate career with Colorado College in the Western Collegiate Hockey Association, Canzanello signed an entry-level contract with the Mighty Ducks of Anaheim in 2004. After three seasons within the Ducks organization, Canzanello opted to pursue a European career, in agreeing to a contract with German club, Straubing Tigers of the Deutsche Eishockey Liga.

As a stalwart on defense for the Tigers, Canzanello remained with the team for 8 consecutive seasons. After the 2014–15 season, a second successive season without the playoffs, Canzanello left the Tigers as a free agent and signed for the 2015–16 season in Austria with Villacher EC of the EBEL on March 4, 2015. Canzanello left VSV before the beginning of the season to transfer to the Italian Serie A with HC Valpellice.

References

External links

1981 births
Living people
American men's ice hockey defensemen
Cincinnati Mighty Ducks players
Colorado College Tigers men's ice hockey players
Green Bay Gamblers players
Ice hockey players from Minnesota
Sportspeople from Rochester, Minnesota
San Diego Gulls (ECHL) players
Straubing Tigers players
Syracuse Crunch players
HC Valpellice players